The 1964 Kansas City Athletics season was the tenth for the franchise in Kansas City and the 64th overall.  It involved the A's finishing tenth in the American League with a record of 57 wins and 105 losses, 42 games behind the American League Champion New York Yankees.

Offseason 
In January , owner Charles O. Finley signed an agreement to move the A's to Louisville, promising to change the team's name to the "Kentucky Athletics". (Other names suggested for the team were the "Kentucky Colonels" and the "Louisville Sluggers.") By another 9–1 vote by the league owners, his request was denied. Six weeks later, by the same 9–1 margin, the A.L. owners denied Finley's request to move the team to Oakland, where the team would eventually move after the 1967 season.

On February 28, Finley signed a four-year lease to remain in Kansas City. The club would pay no rent at Municipal Stadium but the city would get 5% on admission and 7.5% on concessions. The clause was that if the club could not reach a paid attendance of 575,000 fans, then the club owed nothing.

In early April, Finley tried to shorten the rather distant fences at the stadium by creating a  Pennant Porch in right field, fronting a tiny bleacher section, to mock the famed short fence in right field at Yankee Stadium, home of the powerful Yankees. Later he tried the ruse of putting a canopy over the little bleacher, which just happened to have an extension that reached out  over the field. The league, not amused by Finley's sense of humor, again ordered him to cease and desist.

Notable transactions 
 October 7, 1963: Sammy Esposito was released by the Athletics.
 November 27, 1963: Norm Siebern was traded to the Baltimore Orioles for Jim Gentile and $25,000.
 December 2, 1963: John Donaldson was selected by the Athletics from the Minnesota Twins in the rule 5 draft.

Regular season 
The club set a franchise record by hitting 107 home runs during home games, while the A's pitching staff gave up 132 home runs during home games. At the time, it was a major league record.
Eighteen-year-old free agent Catfish Hunter was not able to pitch in 1964. He was sent to the Mayo Clinic, as surgeons worked on his right foot, which had been injured in a hunting accident the previous autumn. Hunter recovered at Finley's farm in La Porte, Indiana.
Shortstop Bert Campaneris made his major league debut on July 23 at Minnesota, and hit two home runs off Jim Kaat in the first (first pitch) and seventh innings; joining the team earlier that day, he also singled, walked, and stole a base.
On September 5, 19-year-old Blue Moon Odom made his major league debut against the visiting New York Yankees. Odom started but lasted just two innings, giving up six earned runs on six hits with two walks and one strikeout. The A's tied the game in the third inning, so he did not get the loss.
On September 17, the A's were away on an eastern road trip and The Beatles played Municipal Stadium as part of their first U.S. tour. The date was originally supposed to be an off-day for the band between concerts in New Orleans and Dallas, but they agreed to perform when Finley offered their manager Brian Epstein a then-record sum of $150,000 (equivalent to $1.14 million in 2014). The group opened the half-hour Thursday night concert by saluting the host town with their medley of "Kansas City" and "Hey, Hey, Hey, Hey"; a month later, they would record the medley for their fourth studio album, Beatles for Sale.

Season standings

Record vs. opponents

Notable transactions 
 June 8, 1964: Catfish Hunter was signed as an amateur free agent by the Athletics.
 June 13, 1964: Joe Rudi was signed as an amateur free agent by the Athletics.

Roster

Player stats

Batting

Starters by position 
Note: Pos = Position; G = Games played; AB = At bats; H = Hits; Avg. = Batting average; HR = Home runs; RBI = Runs batted in

Other batters 
Note: G = Games played; AB = At bats; H = Hits; Avg. = Batting average; HR = Home runs; RBI = Runs batted in

Pitching

Starting pitchers 
Note: G = Games pitched; IP = Innings pitched; W = Wins; L = Losses; ERA = Earned run average; SO = Strikeouts

Other pitchers 
Note: G = Games pitched; IP = Innings pitched; W = Wins; L = Losses; ERA = Earned run average; SO = Strikeouts

Relief pitchers 
Note: G = Games pitched; W = Wins; L = Losses; SV = Saves; ERA = Earned run average; SO = Strikeouts

Farm system 

The A's scouts had signed 80 prospects for $650,000, at the time, the most money spent on prospects in one year.

References

External links
1964 Kansas City Athletics team page at Baseball Reference
1964 Kansas City Athletics team page at www.baseball-almanac.com

Oakland Athletics seasons
Kansas City Athletics season
1964 in sports in Missouri